Statistics of Austrian Football Bundesliga in the 2003–04 season.

Overview
It was contested by 10 teams, and Grazer AK won the championship.

League standings

Results
Teams played each other four times in the league. In the first half of the season each team played every other team twice (home and away), and then did the same in the second half of the season.

First half of season

Second half of season

Top goal scorers

External links
Austria - List of final tables (RSSSF)

Austrian Football Bundesliga seasons
Austria
1